List of steam technology patents.  This is a list of patents  relating to steam engines, steam locomotives, boilers, steam accumulators, condensers, etc.

Belgian patents
 BE 904602 (A1), 1986, Boiler fed water heater - has flue gas closed-circuit heat exchanger contg. pure water with self-regulating operation

British patents
 GB 189718087 (A), 1897, Improvements in means for providing for the free circulation of air in steam cylinders when the pistons are running and the steam cut off    
 GB 189921940 (A), 1899, Improvements in feed water purifiers and heaters for steam generators   
 GB 189922137 (A), 1899, Improvement in rotary steam engines   
 GB 189923234 (A), 1899, Improvements in steam generators  
 GB 190006487 (A), 1901, An improvement in starting valves for compound steam engines
 GB 190022906 (A), 1901, Improvements in valves for use in compound locomotives and other compound engines   
 GB 190504645 (A), 1905, Improvements relating to the working of compound engines and in regulator valves therefor   
 GB 190516372 (A), 1906, Improvements in valve gear for locomotives or similar coupled steam engines   
 GB 190604729 (A), 1907, Improvements in locomotive superheaters   
 GB 190605839 (A), 1907, Combined spark arrester and ash ejector for locomotive engines   
 GB 191321689 (A), 1914, Improvements in and relating to power systems  
 GB 125433 (A), 1919, Improvements in or relating to fireless steam locomotives and engines
 GB 235249 (A), 1925, Improvements in closed cycle steam power installations
 GB 446060 (A), 1936, Improvements in or relating to steam power plants comprising feedwater heaters and hot-water accumulators   
 GB 446061 (A), 1936, Improvements in or relating to steam plants including hot-water accumulators
 GB 522279 (A), 1940, Improvements in or relating to plant for operating fireless locomotives
 GB 541689 (A), 1941, Improvements in or relating to steam generators
 GB 626087 (A),  1949, Improvements in or relating to the conversion of fired locomotives into fireless locomotives   
 GB 629296 (A), 1949, Improvements in or relating to apparatus for electrically heating high-pressure steam generators or high-pressure steam accumulators   
 GB 634497 (A), 1950, Improvements in or relating to fireless locomotives having high pressure steam accumulators   
 GB 636122 (A), 1950, Improvements in or relating to charging cranes for fireless locomotives   
 GB 637797 (A), 1950, Improvements in or relating to throttle valves for high-pressure steam accumulator fireless locomotives
 GB 639989 (A), 1950, Improvements in or relating to the arrangement of controls in the cabs of fireless locomotives   
 GB 640235 (A), 1950, Improvements in or relating to high pressure steam accumulator locomotives 
 GB 738935 (A), 1955, Fireless steam-driven vehicle
 GB 888793 (A), 1962,  Solid fuel grates for locomotive fire boxes
 GB 929486 (A), 1963, Means for supplying solid fuel to locomotive fire boxes

Canadian patents
 CA 2039935 (A1), 1992, Electrical steam locomotive

French patents
 FR 2609152 (A1), 1988, Removable furnace body, burning poor-grade (lean) fuel, for an industrial generator

German patents
 DE 4005467 (A1), 1990, Blast pipe for steam locomotive - has control systems for varying pipe opening
 DE 4311775 (A1), 1994, Feedwater-preheater construction for preheating temperatures above 100 deg C for steam generators, in particular locomotive-type boilers
 DE 19746384 (A1), 1999, Steam locomotive with steam storage boiler coupled to running gear, and used for shunting and industrial purposes

Japanese patents
 JP 8144702 (A), 1996, Rotary steam engine

Russian patents
 RU 2421619 (C1), 2011, Method of operating steam locomotive tandem compound steam engine

US patents
 US 4425763 (A), 1984, Coal-fired steam locomotive 
 US 4633818 (A), 1987, Mobile coal-fired fluidized bed power unit 
 US 2011180024 (A1), 2011, Steam boiler with radiants

References

steam technology patents
Steam power